The Senior Enlisted Advisor to the Chief of the National Guard Bureau (abbreviated SEA) is the top enlisted person in the National Guard of the United States; which is a joint reserve component of the United States Army and the United States Air Force.

The SEA's responsibilities include advising the Chief of the National Guard Bureau on all enlisted matters affecting training and utilization, the health of the force, and enlisted professional development of National Guard Soldiers and Airmen.

Insignia
In 2020, as part of Whitehead's appointment, a unique rank and insignia were created for the position.

List of officeholders

See also 
 Chief of the National Guard Bureau
 Vice Chief of the National Guard Bureau
 Senior Enlisted Advisor to the Chairman of the Joint Chiefs of Staff
 Master Chief Petty Officer of the Navy
 Sergeant Major of the Army
 Sergeant Major of the Marine Corps
 Chief Master Sergeant of the Air Force
 Chief Master Sergeant of the Space Force
 Master Chief Petty Officer of the Coast Guard

References 

 
Senior Enlisted Advisor